The discography of the R&B group 702.

Albums

Singles

As featured artist

Soundtrack appearances

Album appearances

Kameelah Williams (backing vocals)

LeMisha Grinstead as "LeMisha 702" (lead and backing vocals)

Filmography

Irish Grinstead

References

External links
 

Contemporary R&B discographies
Discographies of American artists